Roy Eldon Kelly (September 16, 1925 – September 26, 2015) was a Canadian professional hockey player who played 441 games in the American Hockey League, for the Cleveland Barons and St. Louis Flyers.

Kelly also had a coaching career, coaching the Calgary Stampeders and Drumheller Miners in the Alberta Senior Hockey League. His 1965–66 Miners team won the Allan Cup. He resided near Radium Hot Springs, British Columbia. Kelly died in 2015.

References

External links
 

1925 births
2015 deaths
Canadian ice hockey right wingers
St. Louis Flyers players